The Tarsha Gale Cup is one of the main Women's rugby league elite aged group competitions in Australia.

The New South Wales Rugby League announced the creation of a nine-a-side under-18s women's league for 2017 Named the Tarsha Gale Nines after the former Australian Jillaroos and NSW captain of the 1990s.

However, since 2020, the tournament has been played as a full 13-a-side game, and is the main bridge between juniors and the NSWRL Women's Premiership in the state of New South Wales.

History

Clubs
Tarsha Gale Cup operates on a single table system, with no divisions, conferences nor promotion and relegation from other leagues.  In 2018, the St. George Dragons and the Newcastle Knights entered teams into the competition for the first time.

Current clubs

Venues

Players

Season structure

Pre-season
Prior to the commencement of the home-and-away season teams are paired off to play an exhibition trial match. In 2017 these matches took place during varying weeks of January.

Premiership season

Grand Final

The two highest place teams at the conclusion of the home-and-away season will qualify for the Grand final. The winner of this match is determined the competition's premier.

Results By Year

Premiership Tally 

Bold means the team still currently plays in the competition.

Awards
The following major individual awards and accolades are presented each season

Media coverage

Television

TBA

Online

Selected games each week via NSWRL TV.

Corporate relations

Sponsorship
The Harvey Norman is the league's current and inaugural naming rights partner.

Merchandising
Official match day attire together with other club merchandise is sold through the NRL's stores and website as well through the clubs and through some retailers.

See also

Women's rugby league in Australia
Women's rugby league

References

External links

 
Women's rugby league competitions in Australia
Rugby league nines
Rugby league competitions in New South Wales
Rugby league in Sydney
2017 establishments in Australia
Sports leagues established in 2017